Walton Bryan Stewart (April 20, 1914May 10, 1976) was an American teacher, machinist, labor activist, and Democratic politician.  He served one term in the Wisconsin State Assembly, representing part of the north side of the city of Milwaukee.

Early life and career

Stewart was born in Henderson, Tennessee. He graduated from Lane College, and became a teacher in Henderson, eventually serving as principal of Chester County Training School. In 1944, he moved to Milwaukee, Wisconsin, where he became active in the labor movement and in the Democratic Party.

Politics 
Stewart, active in the labor movement, was chairman for several years of the 6th ward Democratic Party, and was elected a delegate at large to the 1952 Democratic National Convention.

He was elected to the Wisconsin House of Representatives in 1954 to represent the newly-redistricted 2nd Milwaukee County district (now consisting of the 2nd Ward of the City of Milwaukee); fellow Democrat Michael F. O'Connell, whose district had included what was now the 2nd District, was not a candidate for re-election.  He won the September 1954 Democratic primary with 983 votes to 829 for former Assemblyman Le Roy Simmons and the November general election with 3,851 votes to 1,230 for Republican George Wolfgram and 29 for independent Albert Stergar. He was assigned to the standing committee on elections.

In the 1956 primary, he lost the Democratic nomination to Norman Sussman, with 1,028 votes to Sussman's 1,082. He ran in the general election as an "Independent Democrat", but came in third, with 1,030 votes to Sussman's 3,879 and Republican Paul Urban's 1,406.

Later life 
Walton was the only African-American member of the Milwaukee Motion Picture Commission in its last years (it was abolished in 1971).

He continued to work as a teacher and was head of the mathematics department at Roosevelt Junior High School in Milwaukee.  He died on May 10, 1976.

References

People from Henderson, Tennessee
Democratic Party members of the Wisconsin State Assembly
Lane College alumni
1914 births
1976 deaths
20th-century American politicians
African-American state legislators in Wisconsin
20th-century African-American politicians